This is a list of South African television related events from 2012.

Events
2 October - Khaya Mthethwa wins the eighth season of Idols South Africa, becoming the show's first South African black person to have won.
18 October - 11-year-old poet Botlhale Boikanyo wins the third season of SA's Got Talent.

Debuts

International
25 February -  Once Upon a Time (M-Net Series)
14 March -  2 Broke Girls (M-Net)
29 May -  Alcatraz (M-Net)
13 July -  Little Mosque on the Prairie (SABC 3)
17 July -  Life with Boys (SABC 1)
17 July -  Baggage (Sony Channel)
28 August -  Dallas (2012) (M-Net)
27 November - / Combat Hospital (M-Net Series)
 Bananas in Pyjamas (CGI) (E.tv)
/ Voltron Force (SABC 1)

Changes of network affiliation

Television shows

1980s
Good Morning South Africa (1985–present)
Carte Blanche (1988–present)

1990s
Top Billing (1992–present)
Generations (1994–present)
Isidingo (1998–present)

2000s
Idols South Africa (2002–present)
Rhythm City (2007–present)
SA's Got Talent (2009–present)

Ending this year

Births

Deaths

See also
2012 in South Africa